MNUFC2 is an American professional soccer team that is located in St. Paul, Minnesota. It is the reserve team of Minnesota United FC and participates in MLS Next Pro.

History 
On December 6, 2021, MNUFC2 were named as one of 21 clubs that would field a team in the new MLS Next Pro league beginning in the 2022 season.

Players and staff

Roster

Out on loan

Staff 
 Cameron Knowles – head coach
 Jeremy Hall – assistant coach
 Jonathan Barber – goalkeepers coach

Team records

Year-by-Year

Head coaches record

See also 
 MLS Next Pro

References

External links 
 

Association football clubs established in 2021
2021 establishments in Minnesota
Minnesota United FC
Soccer clubs in Minnesota
Reserve soccer teams in the United States
MLS Next Pro teams